Edith Minturn Stokes (June 20, 1867 - June 12, 1937) was an American philanthropist, artistic muse and socialite during the Gilded Age.

Early life and family background
Edith Minturn was born on June 20, 1867 in West Brighton, in Staten Island, New York City. She was the third child and second daughter of shipping magnate Robert Bowne Minturn Jr. (1836-1889) and his wife Susannah Shaw (1839-1926). The Minturn family was well connected both politically, and with other prominent families via marriage. Her uncle, Robert Gould Shaw, was killed while commanding the nation’s first all-black regiment.

Minturn was educated at home, with music and French lessons, and went on a Grand Tour of Europe, as was then expected of society women.
 
Minturn had several siblings. Her brother Robert Shaw Minturn married Bertha Howard Potter, granddaughter of Bishop Alonzo Potter, niece of Henry Codman Potter, and great-granddaughter of Eliphalet Nott. Her sister Sarah May Minturn married Henry Dwight Sedgwick. They were grandparents of Edie Sedgwick and great-grandparents of Kyra Sedgwick. Their son Robert Minturn Sedgwick married Helen Peabody, daughter of Endicott Peabody. Her sister Mildred Scott married Arthur Hugh Scott, headmaster of a French boarding school for boys. They eventually relocated to England. Her sister Gertrude Minturn married Amos Richard Eno Pinchot. They had two children, one of whom, Rosamond Pinchot, was an actress famed mostly for her great beauty.

Philanthropy and artistic muse

She was the President of the New York Kindergarten Association, ran a sewing school for immigrant women, and was a benefactor of St. George's Church in New York City.

Edith Minturn Stokes began modelling by participating in the then popular pastime known as tableaux vivants; she was spotted at these and became a model for Daniel Chester French in his Greenwich Village atelier.

So it was that she posed for his sculpture The Republic, which was a centerpiece of the Court of Honor of the  Columbian Exposition of 1893 in Chicago. It was a  plaster statue covered in gold leaf, and with an illuminated crown. The sculpture was destroyed by fire in 1896 and the sculptor was commissioned to produce a smaller version, the Statue of the Republic, a   gilded bronze sculpture that was erected in 1918 and still stands.

Peter Marié accumulated a collection of watercolor-on-ivory miniatures of society beauties, and she was one of those he selected. These are now on display at the New-York Historical Society Museum.

John Singer Sargent’s portrait Mr. and Mrs. I. N. Phelps Stokes is on display in the American Wing of the Metropolitan Museum of Art.

Personal life
On 25 August 1895, at Pointe-á-Pic, Quebec, she married Isaac Newton Phelps Stokes (1867-1944).

The couple had no biological children, but in 1908 adopted a 3 year old girl, Helen, a daughter of Raj Lieutenant Colonel Maldion Byron Bicknell and his wife Mildred Bax-Ironside, who did not want to raise children in India, where they were stationed. Helen married twice, first in 1928 to Edwin Katte Merrill, and had two daughters and two sons. Her second husband was Donald Bush. Helen died in 2004.

Edith suffered from a series of strokes in late life, and died on June 12, 1937 in her home at 953 Fifth Avenue, New York City.

References

1867 births
1937 deaths
People from West New Brighton, Staten Island
People from the Upper East Side
Philanthropists from New York (state)
American socialites
Muses
Sedgwick family
Winthrop family